Dobê is a village and township in the Tibet Autonomous Region of China. It lies at an altitude of 4,234 metres (13,894 feet).

It lies approximately 16.9 miles south of Sangsang.

See also
List of towns and villages in Tibet

Populated places in Shigatse
Township-level divisions of Tibet